Seyyed Nasir ol Din Mohammad (also Romanized as Seyyed Naşīr ol Dīn Moḩammad, Seyyed Naşīr ed Dīn Moḩammad, and Seyyed Naşīr od Dīn Moḩammad; also known as Emāmzādeh Seyyed Naşīr od Dīn Moḩammad) is a village in Sardasht Rural District, Zeydun District, Behbahan County, Khuzestan Province, Iran. At the 2006 census, its population was 52, in 14 families.

References 

Populated places in Behbahan County